RING finger protein unkempt-like is a protein that in humans is encoded by the UNKL gene.

References

Further reading